Kakumiro is a town in the Western Region of Uganda. It is the main municipal, administrative, and commercial center of Kakumiro District, and the district headquarters are located there.

Location
The geographical coordinates of the town are 0°46'52.0"N, 31°19'23.0"E (Latitude:0.781111; Longitude:31.323056).

Points of interest
Kakumiro has the following points of interest. Firstly, the Kakumiro Health Centre IV. This facility is administered by the Kakumirio District local government, whose leaders advocate for its elevation to hospital status. Secondly, the Mubende–Kakumiro–Kibaale–Kagadi Road, which passes through the middle of town in a general east-to-west direction.

See also
Kibaale
Kagadi
Bunyoro sub-region

References

External links

Populated places in Western Region, Uganda
Cities in the Great Rift Valley
Kakumiro District